Ziya Yusupovich Bazhayev (July 11, 1960 —  March 9, 2000) was a prominent Russian businessman of Chechen origin specializing in oil trading. He died in Moscow during a crash of a Yakovlev Yak-40 aircraft shortly after takeoff on March 9, 2000, together with a Russian journalist, Artyom Borovik.

Bazhayev's death is mentioned in many Nigerian 419 scam e-mails.

Literature
 Musa Geshaev. Famous Chechens. — Moscow: Musaizdat, 2006. — Vol. 4. — pp. 126-159.

References

20th-century Russian businesspeople
1960 births
2000 deaths
Russian people of Chechen descent
Chechen people
Victims of aviation accidents or incidents in Russia
Russian businesspeople in the oil industry
People from Achkhoy-Martanovsky District